Alamo (Spanish: Álamo; meaning "Poplar tree") is an unincorporated community and census-designated place (CDP) in Contra Costa County, California, in the United States. Alamo is equidistant between the city of Walnut Creek and the incorporated town of Danville. As of the 2010 census, the population was 14,750. 

Police services are provided by the Contra Costa County Office of the Sheriff. Fire and EMS services are provided by the San Ramon Valley Fire Protection District.

Alamo has a median household income of $300,000.
In August 2007, a group of citizens launched a new initiative to incorporate the community, the latest in a series of attempts that go back to the early 1960s or before; it was defeated by referendum in March 2009. Previous failed Alamo incorporation efforts always included parts of other nearby unincorporated areas: Alamo-Danville (1964) and Alamo-Danville-San Ramon (1976).

History
Alamo was first inhabited by the Tatcan Indians over 5000 years ago. The Tatcan Indians, a Bay Miwok tribe closely connected to the Saclans of Walnut Creek, lived in Alamo in the eighteenth century.

After Mission San José was founded in 1797, its grazing area stretched throughout the San Ramon Valley. The Mexican land grant Rancho San Ramon was deeded to Mariano Castro and his uncle Bartolo Pacheco in 1833. It covered modern-day Danville and Alamo. Castro owned the northern half, which included Alamo.

In 1843 much of the Alamo, Las Trampas and Tice Valley areas were granted to brothers Inocencio and José Romero. It was called Rancho El Sobrante de San Ramon. Because of missing title papers, the brothers lost their ranch in American courts in 1857.

Pioneers Mary Ann and John Jones traveled through Alamo in 1847. She provided the earliest English description of the area in her diary. Her husband stopped the wagon saying, "Mary, look! Did you ever see anything so beautiful?" She wrote later:

On every side, the valley and surrounding hills were covered with thick, velvety clover, and with wild oats standing waist high waving and rippling in the summer breeze, like the bosom of a lake.
The Jones family returned to Alamo in 1851, after California had become a state. John became the first postmaster in 1852 and she applied her considerable energies to schooling children and beginning a Cumberland Presbyterian church. Other early Alamo founders included David Glass, George Engelmeyer, Silas and Susanna Stone, Captain Wall, Joshua Bollinger, and James Foster.

The area was named Alamo, which comes from the Spanish word álamo, meaning "poplar" or "cottonwood." Because of its location and climate, Alamo grew quickly. An early road from the redwoods near Moraga ran through Tice Valley to Alamo, since Americans preferred redwood for building materials instead of Mexican adobe brick.

The Hemme, Bollinger, Jones and Stone ranches began by grazing cattle and raising wheat and other grains. In 1891 the Hemme train station was placed near today's Hemme Avenue; later it was renamed the Alamo station.

Eventually orchards and vineyards spread across the area. Almonds, walnuts, pears, grapes and other fruit thrived in the temperate climate. In 1873, Alamo pioneer Myron Hall grafted Persian cuttings to native walnut trees and helped start the prosperous walnut industry in Contra Costa County. This "mother tree" was tended for over 100 years.

The Alamo post office is the oldest continuously operated one in the valley. It was always an important community gathering place. According to longtime postmaster Bertha Linhares, when the mail was expected the men sat in the post office-store in the winter … the women went into our sitting room and visited with my mother … We always heard all the news and troubles of the Alamo residents. Her father, brother and sister were also postmasters from 1905 to 1960.

Geography

Alamo is located in Contra Costa County, at the northern end of the -long San Ramon Valley between two Coast Ranges − the Las Trampas Ridge to the west and the Diablo Range to the east. The city of San Ramon and the town of Danville are also located in this valley. Just to the north of Alamo lies the city of Walnut Creek. A few miles to the east of Alamo stands the -tall Mount Diablo.

Climate
Alamo experiences a warm-summer Mediterranean climate with hot, dry summers and cool, rainy winters. Summer high temperatures are hot, but due to the high degree of seasonal diurnal temperature variation, the mean temperature remains low enough to qualify as a warm-summer Mediterranean climate, staying below . Temperatures occasionally reach  or higher in the warmest months, and frost occurs on some clear mornings during the coldest months. There are, on average 42 days per annum with at least  of rain (days when it is considered useful to carry an umbrella). During cold winter storms, snow can fall on top of nearby Mount Diablo, but very seldom falls in the Valley.

On July 6, 2017 at 3:44 pm until January 9, 2018, the Cal Fire reported that the Alamo Fire occurred.

Parks

Andrew H. Young Park

Located at the corner of Danville Blvd. & Jackson Way. This 1 acre park is named in memory of Alamo resident Andrew H. Young who was instrumental in preserving the charm of Alamo.

He served in 1980 as chairman of the county Planning Commission, and as a commissioner from 1977 to 1979 with the San Ramon Valley Area Planning Commission.

Young was a World War II veteran, serving in the Pacific campaign where he assisted in the evacuation of the Chinese Fifth Army from North Vietnam. He retired in 1965 from active reserve as a Navy lieutenant commander.

His participation in the Lafayette Local Government Study Committee in 1966–67 led to that city's incorporation in 1968. His Boulevard of Trees project replanted dying trees along Danville Boulevard in Alamo.

He was on the Tao House study committee in Danville and the steering committee for San Ramon Valley Regional Medical Center. He was an executive director for the Contra Costa County Historical Society, as well its president from 1985–1986 and also was a president of the Alamo Park Foundation.

Livorna Park

Located at the corner of Livorna Road & Miranda Avenue, this 4.4 acre community park features a large open-air gazebo, a bocce ball court, a multi-use sports court, playground structures, large play areas, drinking fountain, restrooms, two barbecue areas, ample grassed area and off-street parking.

During the summer months a series of concerts are held at the park in the early evenings typically over a weekend. The concerts are organized by the Alamo Municipal Advisory Committee.

The park also typically hosts a children's Easter egg hunt each year on Easter Sunday. This is organized by the Rotary Club of Alamo.

Rancho Romero School Sports Field and Park
Located at 180 Hemme Avenue, this 5.4 acre park features soccer and softball fields, playground structures and restroom facilities. Note that it is open to the public only after normal school hours.

Alamo School Sports Field
Located at 100 Wilson Road, this 2.2 acre community park offers soccer and baseball fields, batting cages, two multi-use sport courts and a picnic area. Note that it is open to the public only after school hours.

Hap Magee Ranch Park

Located on the Alamo-Danville Border at 1025 La Gonda Way. This 16.3 acre park has several historic structures and is managed jointly by Alamo and Danville. A barn façade at the park entrance memorializes the park's former use as a ranch for longhorn steer with the owner being Hap Magee during the years of 1953 and 1985.

Before the cattle ranch, the site was a summer camp for San Francisco orphans, known as Camp Swain. The property was purchased in 1874 by Captain Isaac and Ann Trasker Swain on behalf of an orphanage in San Francisco. The Swains thought the children should have a warm place to go during San Francisco's damp summers. In 1911 the San Francisco Protestant Orphanage first brought their children to Camp Swain. The orphans came to the valley from 1911 to 1952, using the train and then buses. There is a drinking fountain commemorating Camp Swain with a plaque and a brick rendering of children playing.

Today there are picnic facilities, children's water play area, a large meadow with a spectacular heritage oak, dog parks and off-street parking. The park sits near the intersection of the Iron Horse Trail and the Las Trampas to Mt. Diablo Regional Trail.

Las Trampas Regional Wilderness
Las Trampas Regional Wilderness is a  park located to the immediate southwest of the town. The wilderness contains numerous plant and animal communities, including forested hillsides and riparian woods.

Geology

The Mount Diablo thrust fault runs through Alamo releasing small tremors about every other month. The fault line has never had a history of being dangerous. However, the Hayward Fault, a close neighbor, is extremely active.

Demographics

{{US Census population
|1960= 1791
|1980= 8505
|1990= 12277
|2000= 15626
|2010= 14570
|2020= 15314
|footnote=source:<ref>Area reported as Alamo-Danville during the 1970 census, which recorded a population of 14,059. (The separate communities of Alamo and Danville were not returned separately by the census).</ref>
}}

The 2010 United States Census reported that Alamo had a population of 14,570. The racial makeup of Alamo was 12,662 (86.9%) White, 1,190 (8.2%) Asian, Hispanic or Latino of any race were 839 persons (5.8%), 479 (3.3%) from two or more races, 126 (0.9%) from other races, 73 (0.5%) African American, 22 (0.2%) Pacific Islander and 18 (0.1%) Native American.

The Census reported that 14,539 people (99.8% of the population) lived in households, 22 (0.2%) lived in non-institutionalized group quarters, and 9 (0.1%) were institutionalized.

There were 5,152 households, out of which 1,921 (37.3%) had children under the age of 18 living in them, 3,982 (77.3%) were opposite-sex married couples living together, 274 (5.3%) had a female householder with no husband present, 141 (2.7%) had a male householder with no wife present. There were 111 (2.2%) unmarried opposite-sex partnerships, and 43 (0.8%) same-sex married couples or partnerships. 598 households (11.6%) were made up of individuals, and 341 (6.6%) had someone living alone who was 65 years of age or older. The average household size was 2.82. There were 4,397 families (85.3% of all households); the average family size was 3.05.

The population was spread out, with 3,739 people (25.7%) under the age of 18, 695 people (4.8%) aged 18 to 24, 2,095 people (14.4%) aged 25 to 44, 5,470 people (37.5%) aged 45 to 64, and 2,571 people (17.6%) who were 65 years of age or older. The median age was 47.7 years. For every 100 females, there were 98.6 males. For every 100 females age 18 and over, there were 94.9 males.

The homeowner vacancy rate was 1.2%; the rental vacancy rate was 6.5%. 13,340 people (91.6% of the population) lived in owner-occupied housing units and 1,199 people (8.2%) lived in rental housing units.

Education
Public education in the majority of Alamo is provided by the San Ramon Valley Unified School District.
There are three schools in total; two elementary schools and one middle school:

Alamo School: Today's Alamo Elementary School at 100 Wilson Road opened in 1965. It is the fourth Alamo school bearing the name. It has the original school bell from the 1880s in its courtyard. The dedication ceremony for the bell was March 22, 1974. The bell has a San Ramon Valley Historical Society plaque that commemorates the history of early education in Alamo. The three previous Alamo Schools were built near what is today the corner of Stone Valley Road West and Danville Boulevard. The first Alamo school was built back in 1871.
Rancho Romero Elementary School: The school was originally built in 1959. At that time it consisted of 12 classrooms and a small teachers' room/office combination. In 1961, a main office, kindergarten, library, multi-use room and additional classrooms were added. At present, there are 556 students and 25 self-contained classrooms. Measure A funds were used during the 1993–94 school year for a $2.5 million reconstruction of the entire school. In 1998, Rancho was designated by the Alamo Parks and Recreation Committee (R7A) to receive $350,000 for field and playground renovations and to establish park amenities for the community.
Stone Valley Middle School is a Middle School in the suburbs of Alamo. The school has a 21-1 student to teacher ratio. Stone Valley has been newly remodeled with a budget of around 29 million USD. It has an estimated 560 students (52% boys and 48% girls).

A small portion of Alamo is in the Walnut Creek Elementary School District and the Acalanes Union High School District.

Transportation

Interstate 680, running north–south, is the main highway serving the San Ramon Valley. It runs north through cities such as Walnut Creek and Concord, providing access to Wine Country, Sacramento and Lake Tahoe (accessible via Interstate 80). Going south, I-680 passes through cities including Pleasanton and Fremont, ultimately reaching San Jose.

State Highway 24, which intersects I-680 in adjacent Walnut Creek, provides access to San Francisco, Oakland and Berkeley via the Caldecott Tunnel running under the Berkeley Hills.

County Connection routes 21 and 321, running on weekdays and weekends respectively, provide local bus service along Danville Boulevard in Alamo, south to Danville and San Ramon and north to Walnut Creek, terminating at the BART station.

Notable residents
 Brandon Belt - San Francisco Giants MLB player
 Joan Buchanan - Former member of the California State Assembly
 Steven Burd - Safeway Inc. Supermarket president and CEO
 Mark Davis - Oakland Raiders Owner
 David Duffield - CEO of Workday, Inc and currently on Forbes List of billionaires
 Bret Hedican - former Anaheim Ducks NHL player
 Greg Kent - ex AFL/NFL player for the Detroit Lions and Oakland Raiders 
 Greg Kragen - ex NFL player for the Denver Broncos, Kansas City Chiefs, and Carolina Panthers
 Tony La Russa - MLB manager of the Chicago White Sox
 Katherine Langford - Actress
 Mark McGwire - former MLB player
 Mike Moore - former Oakland Athletics pitcher
 Jason Newsted - former Metallica bassist
 Greg Sestero - Actor, star of cult classic The Room, author of The Disaster Artist, raised in Alamo
 Ellen Tauscher - Former Congresswoman for California's 10th congressional district
 Bree Turner - Actress, starred on NBC's Grimm'', raised in Alamo
 Kristi Yamaguchi - Olympic gold medalist
 Tony Eldridge - Film Producer, The Equalizer 2, raised in Alamo.
 Alan Silvestri - American composer and conductor known for his film and television scores.

References

Notes

External links

Alamo Community Web Site

Census-designated places in Contra Costa County, California
Census-designated places in California
Unincorporated communities in Contra Costa County, California